

277001–277100 

|-bgcolor=#f2f2f2
| colspan=4 align=center | 
|}

277101–277200 

|-id=106
| 277106 Forgó || 2005 GY || László Forgó (1907–1985), a Hungarian mechanical engineer and co-inventor of the Heller–Forgó system || 
|}

277201–277300 

|-bgcolor=#f2f2f2
| colspan=4 align=center | 
|}

277301–277400 

|-bgcolor=#f2f2f2
| colspan=4 align=center | 
|}

277401–277500 

|-bgcolor=#f2f2f2
| colspan=4 align=center | 
|}

277501–277600 

|-bgcolor=#f2f2f2
| colspan=4 align=center | 
|}

277601–277700 

|-bgcolor=#f2f2f2
| colspan=4 align=center | 
|}

277701–277800 

|-bgcolor=#f2f2f2
| colspan=4 align=center | 
|}

277801–277900 

|-id=816
| 277816 Varese ||  || The city of Varese in northern Italy. The "city of gardens" is located between several lakes including Lake Maggiore and in proximity to the Alps. || 
|-id=883
| 277883 Basu ||  || Shantanu Basu (born 1964), an American astrophysicist whose numerical studies on the formation of stars explained the effect of magnetic fields on cloud core and disk formation. He is also one of the originators of the Migrating Embryo model, which describes the evolution of circumstellar discs (Src). || 
|}

277901–278000 

|-bgcolor=#f2f2f2
| colspan=4 align=center | 
|}

References 

277001-278000